Myrmelachistini is a tribe of ants in the family Formicidae. There are at least 2 genera and 50 described species in Myrmelachistini. 

In 2016, the tribe Myrmelachistini was resurrected and the genera Brachymyrmex and Myrmelachista were transferred to it from the tribe Plagiolepidini.

Genera
 Brachymyrmex Mayr, 1868 (rover ants)
 Myrmelachista Roger, 1863

References

Further reading

 
 
 
 
 

Formicinae